HD 211392 is a suspected variable star in the equatorial constellation of Aquarius, positioned about 370 light-years away. With an apparent magnitude close to six, according to the Bortle scale it is just visible to the naked eye from dark, rural skies. It is a giant star with a stellar classification of K3III.

References

External links
 SIMBAD database for HR 8500
 Image of HD 211392 at Aladin previewer

Aquarius (constellation)
211392
K-type giants
8500
Suspected variables
110009
Durchmusterung objects